HMNZS Aotearoa, formerly the Maritime Sustainment Capability project, is an auxiliary ship of the Royal New Zealand Navy. Builder Hyundai Heavy Industries delivered the ship to the Navy in June 2020, and she was commissioned into service on 29 July 2020. Full operational capability was expected to be achieved in 2021. The vessel will serve as a replenishment oiler, and has replaced , the Navy’s last fleet oiler, which was decommissioned in December 2017.

Aotearoa is the largest ship the Royal New Zealand Navy has operated.

Name 
HMNZS Aotearoa bears the Māori name for New Zealand. Aotearoa is commonly translated "the land of the long white cloud". The ship has been assigned the pennant number A11.

Design and description 
The ship is ice-strengthened and winterised to facilitate operations in Antarctica's extreme weather conditions.

In addition to the wave-piercing hull design, this was Rolls-Royce's first naval hybrid electrical system. Rolls-Royce designed a hybrid-electric propulsion system solution that provides the ship with an optimised and flexible power plant with several fuel-saving operating modes.  The ability to propel the ship using the electrical power through the MTU diesel generators whilst also providing electrical power for the ship’s hotel services and mission systems means that the vessel's fuel consumption is significantly reduced and emissions are minimised. The Rolls-Royce Power & Propulsion System arrangement consists of two Bergen main propulsion engines and four MTU4000 diesel generator sets. Aotearoa is a Polar-class Logistics Support ship designed and built with specialised winterisation capabilities for her operations in Antarctica. The electrical sub-systems were designed to support the high power generation capacity required for an ice-class ship.

Aotearoa is intended to support other navy warships by enabling re-fueling (diesel) and re-supplying (food and ammunition) during operations. The  ship will provide marine diesel oil and aviation fuel. It stores food and ammunition in  containers. Aotearoa has a Kelvin Hughes Integrated Naval Bridge System and is equipped with Farsounder-1000 sonar. For navigation radar sensors it uses SharpEye S and X-Band with an S-Band SharpEye sensor optimised for helicopter approach and control. It is armed with a Phalanx CIWS and two Mini Typhoon mounts and has a flight deck and hangar for helicopter operations.

Construction 
The contract was awarded to Hyundai Heavy Industries using a Rolls-Royce Environship concept design, beating competition from Daewoo Shipbuilding & Marine Engineering offering a variant of the BMT designed Royal Fleet Auxiliary  tanker. The ship was laid down on 13 August 2018. It was launched in April 2019, began builder's sea trials in December of that year and was formally delivered in June 2020. It was originally intended to be delivered in January 2020, but its departure from the shipyard in South Korea was delayed due to the COVID-19 pandemic.

Operational history 
Aotearoa and  participated in an international defence exercise in South East Asia in 2021 and also interacted with the United Kingdom’s Carrier Strike Group (CSG) as it conducted engagement activities in the Indo-Pacific region.

In early 2022 Aotearoa made a successful resupply mission to McMurdo and Scott base Antarctica. On 15 June Aotearoa set sail for RIMPAC 2022, where the vessel took part in the month-long exercise. Aotearoa remained in the Asia-Pacific region for nearly six months for various engagements that were not specified.

Notes

References 

2019 ships
Ships built by Hyundai Heavy Industries Group
Auxiliary ships of the Royal New Zealand Navy